Hubert Phipps may refer to:

 Hubert G. Phipps (born 1957), American sculptor and painter
 Hubert Beaumont Phipps (1905–1969), Virginia publisher and editor